The seventh season of Saturday Night Live, an American sketch comedy series, originally aired in the United States on NBC between October 3, 1981, and May 22, 1982.

Background
Following the dismissal of producer Jean Doumanian during the show's sixth season, Dick Ebersol, the program's developer, was hired as Doumanian's replacement. In March 1981, Ebersol dismissed several of her cast members (repertory players Gilbert Gottfried, Ann Risley and Charles Rocket and featured players Yvonne Hudson, Matthew Laurance and Patrick Weathers). After one episode on April 11, 1981, the show was shut down for the rest of the season because of the 1981 Writers Guild of America strike. In the break, Ebersol would also dismiss repertory players Denny Dillon and Gail Matthius, and featured players Laurie Metcalf and Emily Prager were not asked back as cast members.

The new cast of Saturday Night Live for season7 included most of the repertory players from the final Ebersol-produced episode of season6: Robin Duke, Tim Kazurinsky and Tony Rosato along with the sole surviving cast members from Doumanian's era, Eddie Murphy and Joe Piscopo, while adding two new cast members Mary Gross and Christine Ebersole. Brian Doyle-Murray, who had been a writer for season 6, joined Ebersol's new cast as a featured player (he was also a featured player during season 5).

Michael O'Donoghue, who Ebersol brought back to the show in March, remained as head writer for the first half of season7. Some sketches, as well as the appearances of artists like Fear and William S. Burroughs, reflected the increasingly bizarre ideas O'Donoghue had for the show. However, after developing a tense relationship with Ebersol and berating the cast in a meeting following the December 12 episode, O'Donoghue was fired, with Bob Tischler taking the role of head writer.

A new logo was introduced for this season, and was used until season 10: it consisted of the words SATURDAY NIGHT LIVE in the form of a square, with each word after it increasing in size; a modernized version of this logo was used from 2006 to 2014.

Format changes
Wanting to distance the show from its first five seasons, Ebersol cut the popular opening line Live from New York, It's Saturday Night! from the cold openings. Sometimes there were no cold openings, and the monologues were skipped over almost entirely. These changes were not permanent for the series, as Ebersol decided to reverse them for the eighth season. Each episode began with the announcement "And now from New York, the most dangerous city in America, it's Saturday Night Live!"

Ebersol also revamped Weekend Update. The segment went through its first name change (aside from the temporary change to "Saturday Night Newsline" in the final Doumanian episode from March 1981) and became "SNL Newsbreak". At the news desk was featured player Brian Doyle-Murray with Christine Ebersole and Mary Gross alternating as co-anchor. Brian Doyle-Murray also became the first Weekend Update anchor to be a featured player while serving as anchor. The only other anchors to do this were Michael Che, Tina Fey and Colin Jost.

Additionally, this was the first season without Don Pardo (season 40 would become the next due to Don Pardo's death in 2014) as the show announcer. Instead the voice-overs were done by Mel Brandt, except for two episodes that aired in December 1981 when veteran NBC News announcer Bill Hanrahan handled them.

Cast
During the season, original cast member John Belushi died from an overdose of cocaine and heroin. The original airing of the episode hosted by Robert Urich had a tribute to Belushi.

Cast roster

Repertory players
Robin Duke
Christine Ebersole
Mary Gross
Tim Kazurinsky
Eddie Murphy
Joe Piscopo
Tony Rosato

Featured players
Brian Doyle-Murray

bold denotes Weekend Update anchor

Writers

This season's writers were Barry W. Blaustein, Joe Bodolai, Brian Doyle-Murray, Nate Herman, Tim Kazurinsky, Nelson Lyon, Maryilyn Suzanne Miller, Pamela Norris, Mark O'Donnell, Michael O'Donoghue, Margaret Olberman, Tony Rosato, David Sheffield, Rosie Shuster, Andrew Smith, Terry Southern, Bob Tischler and Eliot Wald. The head writers were Michael O'Donoghue (episodes 1–8) and Bob Tischler (episodes 9-20).

Episodes

References

07
1981 American television seasons
1982 American television seasons
Saturday Night Live in the 1980s